Humberto Loayza (21 December 1925 – 30 June 2014) was a Chilean boxer. He competed in the men's welterweight event at the 1948 Summer Olympics.

References

External links
 

1925 births
2014 deaths
Chilean male boxers
Olympic boxers of Chile
Boxers at the 1948 Summer Olympics
People from Iquique
Welterweight boxers
20th-century Chilean people
21st-century Chilean people